Kalveliai Eldership is an eldership in Lithuania, located in the southeast of Vilnius District Municipality, near the border with Belarus.

History 
The history of the village of Kalveliai started in late 19th century, while Šumskas was bought by landlord Kazimieras Šumskis in 1618, and was named after him. In 1696, his son established a church and a Dominican parish school. By 1789, the order had already built a new brick church which remains to this day.

In 2000, Kalveliai saw the construction of a new church, and in 2007, the first monument in Lithuania dedicated to Pope John Paul II was erected nearby.

Economy 
The most common fields of business are agriculture, forestry, services, fish industry and customs services.

Populated places 
The eldership includes 32 villages, and the largest settlements are Kalveliai, Kena, Pakenė and Šumskas.

Ethnic composition 
According to the 2011 National Census:

 Poles - 75.7%
 Belarusians - 8.1%
 Lithuanians - 8.0%
 Russians - 5.9%

According to the 2021 National Census, out of 3950 inhabitants:
 Poles - 2939 (74.4%)
 Lithuanians - 416 (10.5%)
 Belarusians - 255 (6.4%)
 Russians - 229 (5.8%)

Gallery

References 

Elderships in Vilnius District Municipality